Ter Aard is a hamlet in the Netherlands and is part of the Assen municipality in Drenthe.

Ter Aard is a statistical entity, and has its own postal code, however it is considered a part of Zeijen. It was first mentioned in 1335 as "in Arth" and means "near the farmland". In 1840, it was home to 25 people.

References 

Populated places in Drenthe
Assen